Howard Hawks Mitchell (January 13, 1885, Marietta, Ohio – 1943) was an American mathematician who worked on group theory and number theory and who introduced Mitchell's group.

In 1910 he received a PhD from Princeton University as Oswald Veblen's first doctoral student. During the academic year 1910/1911 Mitchell was an instructor at Yale University. At the University of Pennsylvania he was an instructor from 1911 to 1914 and then a professor until his death in 1943 at age 58 from coronary thrombosis.

His doctoral students include Leonard Carlitz.

Selected works

References
 Rank and File American Mathematicians (pdf) by David Zitarelli
 

20th-century American mathematicians
Princeton University alumni
University of Pennsylvania faculty
1885 births
1943 deaths